Datchinamurthy a/l Kataiah (born 30 December 1985) is a Malaysian drug trafficker who was sentenced to death in Singapore for drug trafficking. Datchinamurthy was found guilty of trafficking nearly 45g of heroin across the Woodlands Checkpoint from Malaysia to Singapore in January 2011. Having been convicted of the crime and also not certified as a courier, Datchinamurthy was sentenced to death in 2015. He had an accomplice, Christeen d/o Jayamany, who was sentenced to life imprisonment for the same offence.

After Datchinamurthy lost his appeal in January 2016, he tried to appeal to the President of Singapore for clemency to commute his sentence to life imprisonment. The clemency process took three years before it finally concluded and it was decided that Datchinamurthy should be executed and thus clemency was denied. Originally scheduled on 29 April 2022, his execution is currently suspended due to ongoing appeals he filed in relation to his case.

Personal life
Born on 30 December 1985 in Malaysia, Datchinamurthy Kataiah was the only son of his parents. He grew up together with his three sisters at Johor Bahru. His family was poor during his early life, and Datchinamurthy, who had a cheerful and gentle personality, was close to his family. Despite his poverty, he was kind and helped those in need.

After he finished his secondary school education at age 17 and reached his adult years, Datchinamurthy eventually became engaged to a woman. Their first child was born sometime after Datchinamurthy was arrested for drug trafficking in Singapore.

It was revealed in 2022 that Datchinamurthy's father died a year after his son was arrested for drug offences, and he never got to see his son one last time at his deathbed; Datchinamurthy was also denied leave to go attend the funeral, where the son must be present at a parent's burial according to Hindu traditions.

Crime and sentence

Capture and trial
On 18 January 2011, Datchinamurthy, together with a Singaporean accomplice Christeen Jayamany, were arrested at the Woodlands Checkpoint by the Singapore authorities for allegedly trafficking over 44.96g of heroin across the border of Singapore from Malaysia. As the amount of trafficked heroin exceeds the legal minimum of 15g, Datchinamurthy and Christeen were both charged with capital drug trafficking, which warrants the mandatory death penalty in Singapore if found guilty. They were later both tried in the High Court of Singapore for the alleged offences.

According to both the defendants' accounts, prior to their capture, Chirsteen, who was facing financial difficulties and needed money to take care of her children, was hired by Datchinamurthy through connections and introductions to other people. She was asked to deliver something by Datchinamurthy, who provided her a bag which she should pass to another person, and Datchinamurthy stated he will pay her $200 once the job is done. Christeen also stated she did not know that the bag contained packages of drugs. Likewise, Datchinamurthy denied that he had any knowledge of the drugs. He stated he was offered a job by a friend named "Rajah", who wanted to pay him to deliver some drugs, which Rajah assured him were "not serious" and Datchinamurthy thus believed he was delivering traditional Chinese medicine after checking the bags himself and thus did not suspect anything; the drugs, according to him, looked brown and did not look white (which was the normal appearance of heroin). Datchinamurthy was also in charge of relaying messages between Rajah and Christeen. Hence, both accused persons sought to downplay their conduct and paint themselves as couriers, through their defence lawyers, to escape the death penalty. Under the law, should a drug convict was merely acting as courier or suffering from diminished responsibility, he or she will only be eligible for life imprisonment but not death.

On 8 May 2015, the trial judge Tay Yong Kwang determined that both Christeen and Datchinamurthy were guilty as charged, as he found both of them aware of the existence of heroin and hence failed to rebut the presumption of knowledge. Justice Tay found that in Datchinamurthy's case, he was not acting as a simple drug runner, as he was promised rich payment around hundreds of dollars (in both SGD and Malaysian Ringgit) by his alleged boss Rajah, and he had also took the role of hiring Christeen in helping him to deliver the drugs. It was impossible for him to have huge trust on Rajah, with whom he had a short encounter, and he also demonstrated his huge suspicion that he was carrying illegal drugs, which should have been reflected from the way of operations and delivery. Hence, Datchinamurthy failed to prove himself as a courier and hence, he was sentenced to death by hanging. Christeen, who was certified as a courier and had given substantive assistance to the authorities in tackling drug offences, was spared the gallows and she was therefore sentenced to life imprisonment, with effect from the date of her arrest. Christeen also did not receive caning since she was a female.

Appeal and clemency plea
Datchinamurthy later filed an appeal against his sentence. However, the Court of Appeal of Singapore dismissed his appeal on 5 February 2016, as the three judges - Chao Hick Tin, Andrew Phang and Kan Ting Chiu - determined that Datchinamurthy had failed to rebut the legal presumption of him carrying the illegal drugs and the totality of evidence had suggested no error in convicting Datchinamurthy of his original drug trafficking charge.

Datchinamurthy subsequently submitted an appeal for clemency to the President of Singapore, hoping that his death sentence can be commuted to life imprisonment. Should he succeeded in receiving the pardon, Datchinamurthy would become the first person to escape the gallows after the 1998 clemency pardon of Mathavakannan Kalimuthu, who was, at age 19, guilty of murdering a gangster in 1996. Mathavakannan was paroled and released in 2012 after serving 16 years out of his life sentence due to good behaviour. Datchinamurthy's family and his fiancée gathered to plead for clemency from the Singapore government on his life, and they stated there was no fair trial for Datchinamurthy, since he was allegedly being subjected to different treatment from Christeen, who was given a life sentence instead of death, unlike Datchinamurthy.

In July 2019, Datchinamurthy's clemency appeal was dismissed by President Halimah Yacob, on the advice of the Cabinet. Three other Malaysian convicts on death row - Gobi Avedian, Abdul Helmi Ab Halim and Rahmat Karimon - also lost their clemency pleas at around the same time Datchinamurthy failed to receive his pardon, along with nine other prisoners. There were international fears that this phenomenon might signal a rise in executions of drug traffickers in Singapore, and some Malaysian lawyers also claimed that Singapore had intentionally targeted Malaysian death row convicts, which the Singapore government refuted in return.

Subsequent legal developments
While he was still pending his petition for clemency, together with fellow Malaysian drug convict Prabagaran Srivijayan (16 November 1987 – 14 July 2017), Datchinamurthy and his mother, through his Malaysian lawyer, filed a petition to the High Court of Malaysia, asking for the matter to be taken to the International Court of Justice to prosecute Singapore for the conviction of Malaysian citizens for drug trafficking. However, in March 2017, this lawsuit was not accepted as the Malaysian court has no jurisdiction in a matter related to foreign policy.

After the loss of his clemency petition, on the orders of the President of Singapore, a death warrant was issued for Datchinamurthy, who was scheduled to hang on 12 February 2020 at Changi Prison for his crime. However, the execution date was postponed due to a last-minute appeal filed by Datchinamurthy to delay his execution. Datchinamurthy, together with another Malaysian Gobi Avedian, alleged that the executions at Changi Prison were carried out by kicking the back of the prisoner's neck in the event of the rope breaking, which meant that the convicts would be suffering from unlawful execution and thus being unfairly treated by law. This legal application was dismissed by the High Court on 13 February 2020. Datchinamurthy's lawyer M Ravi also alleged that he was threatened by the prosecution in relation to this matter, which was also rejected by the High Court. The Attorney-General's Chambers (AGC) also issued correction orders under POFMA towards Malaysian human rights group Lawyers for Liberty for starting the above allegations of illegal execution methods, calling these claims "baseless" and "untrue". The Court of Appeal also affirmed the High Court's decision to dismiss the lawsuit in August 2020.

Datchinamurthy was also involved in another lawsuit, which was about the claims of the private letters between the death row inmates and both their lawyers and families were being forwarded from prisons to the AGC, and it led to these said inmates pursuing legal proceedings against the AGC or its members for alleged breaches of conduct to protect the inmates' rights, misconduct in public office and seeking damages for any harm caused by such. Datchinamurthy, together with 21 other death row inmates (most of whom sentenced for drug trafficking), were represented by human rights lawyer M Ravi to seek the identities of whoever ordered or carried out the sending of the inmates' information to the AGC. The lawsuit was dismissed on 16 March 2021. The inmates, including Datchinamurthy, are ordered to pay $10 in costs for the lawsuit. Still, Datchinamurthy and 12 other prisoners out of the 22 original plaintiffs filed civil suits against the Attorney-General of Singapore for this issue, and this lawsuit was later withdrawn in November 2021 by the lawyer Ravi himself, who also had to bear the costs of over $10,000 for this lawsuit.

Separate from Datchinamurthy's case, another death row convict tried to make use of Datchinamurthy's case to argue he was discriminated by nationality regarding the scheduling of executions. Syed Suhail Syed Zin, a Singaporean drug offender who was sentenced to death on 2 December 2015, tried to argue that he was sentenced to death on a date which took place later than Datchinamurthy, yet his own execution was conducted earlier than Datchinamurthy's unscheduled hanging, and due to the travel restrictions of foreigners' entry into Singapore to visit their relatives in prison due to the COVID-19 pandemic in Singapore, he was discriminated as a Singaporean through the scheduling of executions. However, this was not accepted by the courts, as they stated that Datchinamurthy, compared to Suhail who had exhausted all his avenues of appeal, had a different situation given he still have recourse to review his case and appeal, and it was baseless to allege any discriminatory practices against inmates based on nationality in scheduling their executions. Hence, Suhail lost this legal attempt to delay his execution.

Datchinamurthy later filed a legal application to the courts to review his case. The review ended with the Court of Appeal upholding the death sentence passed upon Datchinamurthy on 5 April 2021.

Death warrant and opposition

Scheduling of execution and criticisms
On 22 April 2022, Datchinamurthy's execution was scheduled to take place a week later on 29 April 2022. M. Ravi, who represented Datchinamurthy, called this a "contempt of court" as Datchinamurthy's execution was scheduled to take place a month before his next legal application against the Attorney General can be heard, since the date of hearing was on 20 May 2022. The scheduling of Datchinamurthy's execution attracted criticisms from the rights activists and Malaysian rights lawyer N. Surendran, especially since at the same time, another Malaysian drug trafficker Nagaenthran K. Dharmalingam was pending to be executed on 27 April 2022 despite the allegations that he is intellectually disabled (a fact proven wrong by the psychiatrists and courts of Singapore). There were also pleas for mercy on both Nagaenthran and Datchinamurthy for their lives to be spared.

On 25 April 2022, the United Nations Human Rights Office issued an official statement, in which they opposed to the executions of both Nagaenthran and Datchinamurthy due to their fears that the Singapore government may conduct more executions in the near future with the increasing phenomenon of death warrants issued for drug convicts on death row, and they urged Singapore to reconsider their drug laws and use of the death penalty in the city state. On the same day of the UN's statement, a candlelight vigil was held on behalf of Datchinamurthy and Nagaenthran to show opposition to their upcoming executions. According to Datchinamurthy's sister Sathirani, she said she was very shocked at the prospect that her brother would be executed despite his role as a courier and her brother felt that his punishment was unfair for him. She and the rest of her family members were present at the vigil held for Datchinamurthy but unable to attend since foreigners were prohibited from taking part in any protests in Singapore.

Datchinamurthy's life on death row
In addition, there were allegations that Datchinamurthy was subjected to harsh living conditions while undergoing solitary confinement on death row at Changi Prison. Since 2019, Datchinamurthy and eleven other death row prisoners were transferred to special punishment cells due to the pending minor renovations to their previous cells. According to Datchinamurthy's account to his family, the metallic cell door had no holes, thus the inmates did not have a chance to see or talk to the other prisoners. The estimated size of one punishment cell was measured to about 6×6 feet, and the only fan available was located in the corridor leading to the death row cells. The air could only flow through the door's food slot, and it was very hot and humid during night time. Except for one-inch-thick blankets and a straw mat, there were no mattresses and pillows provided for them during sleep.

Not only so, the cell door has two slots that were locked from the outside. The light bulb provided in each cell was yellow and dim. Since the cells were located in the middle of the building, there were no presence of sunlight in the cells. The cell's window was completely covered with metal netting, thus hindering the entry of natural or artificial light from outside the cell. There is no hot water provided during bath time and the shower water was basically also the prisoners' drinking water. In light of Datchinamurthy's account, there were criticisms from his family and activists that such living conditions were detrimental to the emotional and mental health of the death row prisoners and there was a need to reform to improve the living conditions of Changi Prison's death row cells. Furthermore, the seven-year life on death row took a considerable toll on Datchinamurthy's emotional and mental health, and he began to suffer from high blood pressure, and even attempted suicide once. Amidst the criticisms, activists stated that their hope that Datchinamurthy's story could be a lesson to youngsters, so as to remind them to not get easily swayed into doing crime and invoke sympathy and forgiveness, since most of the death row convicts were alleged drug mules who were manipulated by the drug lords into doing the job.

Interview of Datchinamurthy's mother
Datchinamurthy's 60-year-old mother Lakshmi Amma, who finally met her 36-year-old son for the first time in over a decade just days before his execution, spoke to reporters that she felt her son's punishment was excessive and cruel. She stated that Datchinamurthy grew to reflect and repent on his mistakes, and while he accepted his punishment and imminent fate, he still hoped to continue to live and also, to tell other youngsters to not follow his example if he was ever freed. Lakshmi also said that the death penalty would not only affect one person but the loss of a loved one to the gallows would be an emotional life sentence for the bereaved family.

In addition, it was revealed that due to their poverty, Datchinamurthy's family were unable to come to Singapore regularly to visit him at Changi Prison. Datchinamurthy's mother and three sisters also faced ostracisation and bullying from unsympathetic employers, who denied their requests for leave to visit him in prison. Lakshmi also said that while in prison, Datchinamurthy befriended fellow Malaysian and drug convict Nagaenthran K. Dharmalingam (who stayed in the neighbouring cell) and they became close friends, for which she accepted her son's request to meet Nagaenthran's mother, and both the men's mothers bonded over their loss. Datchinamurthy also told his family to help pray for Nagaenthran, which demonstrate how much Datchinamurthy cared for his friend, who was eventually hanged on 27 April, two days before him.

Letter of Datchinamurthy's fiancée
On the eve of Datchinamurthy's scheduled execution, his fiancée Priya (last name unknown) penned down a touching letter to her fiancé, with whom she had a child. Priya wrote that she and her fiancé's family had long since expected that Datchinamurthy would eventually be executed, but she never expected the huge emotional burden they would have to bear during the final days leading up to the date Datchinamurthy was due to hang. Priya recounted that she often recalled every moment - whether happy or sad - she spent with Datchinamurthy and she felt it was too cruel a way to send her fiancé off. She also stated she could not believe she was discussing with Datchinamurthy's family over his funeral preparations. In her last paragraphs, Priya told Datchinamurthy that she would reunite with him when the moment of her death arrives, and she hoped that he would be free of his sufferings and live well in the afterlife.

Stay of execution

Appeal and verdict
On 28 April 2022, a day before his execution, Datchinamurthy filed a last-minute appeal to seek a stay of execution, stating that he should not be executed when he had a pending legal application (related to prison correspondence misconduct) that had not concluded. He represented himself due to his family unable to engage any legal counsel to represent him. As the timing of this last-minute appeal coincided with the time when Datchinamurthy's best friend Nagaenthran was executed and its resulting aftermath, there were calls from activists and the European Union (EU) for Datchinamurthy's sentence to be commuted, and also, due to the Attorney-General's Chambers issuing a warning against inappropriate moves of making last-minute appeals without new evidence as a result of the abuse of court processes by Nagaenthran, there were no lawyers willing to take Datchinamurthy's case, hence it led to Datchinamurthy having to make his own arguments in court.

Datchinamurthy was later granted a stay of execution, meaning that he would not be executed as scheduled, until the conclusion of his pending lawsuit. The prosecution's appeal to overturn the stay order was rejected on the same day by the Court of Appeal. In their full grounds of decision released on 30 May 2022, the three-judge panel found that Datchinamurthy's upcoming legal application was relevant and it required his involvement since he had a case of alleged unequal treatment and the need for him to be present to give his evidence and testimony in order for the judge to decide if his case is baseless or not. The Court of Appeal also reiterated that this did not mean that a prisoner awaiting capital punishment would automatically be granted a stay of execution on the basis of unequal treatment, since the facts were needed to show if there is a relevant pending legal application in the prisoner's suit, which they mentioned was a contrast to the countless unmeritorious appeals made by executed drug trafficker Nagaenthran K. Dharmalingam (who was hanged on 27 April 2022). The three-judge appellate panel commented that Datchinamurthy appeared to be "singled out" when it comes to the scheduling of his execution in contrast to the twelve other plaintiffs of his civil lawsuit.

Reactions
The exceptional speed at which the prosecution's appeal was lodged, within a matter of hours, caught activists by surprise. Many rights activists showed relief at the temporary respite despite their knowledge that the postponement of Datchinamurthy's execution would not be a permanent reprieve from the gallows.

It was further revealed that the death warrant received by Datchinamurthy in April 2022 was not the first he received in 2022. In fact, his execution date was supposed to be on 12 February 2022, but due to the same pending legal application which Datchinamurthy lodged with twelve other death row prisoners, Datchinamurthy's execution was suspended before it was rescheduled to 29 April and later postponed again.

Later, on 2 June 2022, a representative of the Attorney General's Chambers (AGC) clarified that the court did not meant that the prosecution deliberately single out Datchinamurthy for execution when scheduling his date of execution, and they stated that Datchinamurthy did not make any argument about him being targeted in the scheduling process. The AGC stated that a convict would only have his execution date scheduled only after it was confirmed that he exhausted all his avenues of appeal and the rejection of his clemency appeal. Also, for equality, those who were sentenced to death earlier would have their death warrants finalized earlier than those sentenced later. The AGC also stated they and the Ministry of Home Affairs have a stand that generally, an outstanding civil claim like Datchinamurthy's lawsuit is not related to a convict's death sentence and hence should not be an impediment to the carrying out of one's sentence. This stand was not agreed upon by the Court of Appeal, which determined that Datchinamurthy's death sentence should not be carried out since he had an ongoing civil claim that had not yet concluded.

UN criticism and Singapore's response
On 12 May 2022, eight days before the hearing of Datchinamurthy's latest lawsuit, the human rights experts of the United Nations (UN) appealed to the government of Singapore to commute Datchinamurthy's death sentence to life imprisonment and asked Singapore to impose an immediate moratorium on all executions as a first step to abolish the death penalty. The experts taking part in the appeal not only condemned the two prior executions of Abdul Kahar bin Othman and Nagaenthran K. Dharmalingam, but also stated that Datchinamurthy's execution should be terminated in accordance to international human rights law and standards. They stated that countries with the death penalty should only apply the sentence on the most serious of crimes like intentional murder but not drug trafficking due to it not being one of the most serious crimes, and asked that Singapore should review their stance on the use of capital punishment for drugs.

The UN human rights experts also expressed their concern towards the alleged discriminatory treatment of individuals belonging to minorities (including Datchinamurthy who is an ethnic Indian Malaysian), as attributed to the large number of minorities being sentenced to death row for drug trafficking, and the rumoured reprisals against the legal counsels of death row prisoners. They also stated that the mandatory death penalty "constitutes an arbitrary deprivation of life" since it is imposed without the discretion of considering the mitigating factors of the case or the personal circumstances of the defendant, for which they indirectly referred to the verdict of mandatory death received by Datchinamurthy for drug trafficking without taking into account his personal circumstances or mitigating factors of his case.

In response to the United Nations' criticism of Singapore, Ambassador Umej Bhatia defended the government's decisions to execute Nagaenthran and Abdul Kahar Othman, as well as their use of the death penalty on drugs. Bhatia stated that all criminal proceedings in Singapore were conducted with due process before an "impartial and independent judiciary", and the death penalty would be passed on any suspect if their guilt were proven according to the law. He drew attention to Singapore's decades-long reputation for having a fair and impartial criminal justice system, and an independent and effective judiciary.

Bhatia rebutted that there was no racial discrimination in response to the allegations of racial bias over the large number of minorities on Singapore's death row, and he cited that all individuals were subjected to equal and fair treatment under the laws of Singapore and were not given different treatment based on race or nationality. Bhatia reiterated that there was no need to impose a moratorium since there was no international consensus against the use of the death penalty "when it is imposed according to the due process of law", and added there was "no explicit definition" under international law or international consensus on what constitutes the "most serious crimes". Bhatia ended off his statement by citing that every country has its sovereign right to determine its own criminal justice system, considering its own circumstances and in accordance with its international law obligations.

Post-April appeals

Civil claim and judicial review
The civil lawsuit that Datchinamurthy filed prior to his death warrant and stay of execution was scheduled to be heard on 9 June 2022. Datchinamurthy also filed another appeal for a judicial review of his case, which was fixed on 1 June 2022 and is currently pending.

Lawsuit against Attorney-General
On 3 August 2022, Datchinamurthy was also one of the 24 prisoners (which included murderer Iskandar Rahmat and drug traffickers Pannir Selvam Pranthaman and Abdul Rahim Shapiee) to sue to Attorney-General for the obstruction of the inmates' access to defence counsel, which led to Datchinamurthy and many others having to argue their appeals unrepresented, which allegedly create unfairness to the inmates in legal proceedings. However, the lawsuit was rejected by the High Court as the lawyers have legitimate reasons to turn down the death row cases and there was no evidence that the strict court orders and monetary penalties issued to the lawyers who made unmeritorious appeals had led to many lawyers developing fear over defending the death row inmates. Specifically in Datchinamurthy's case, High Court judge See Kee Oon judged that the 36-year-old Malaysian did not appear to have been prejudiced by the fact that he was unrepresented, as his application for a stay of execution was successful and he was represented in his civil claim at court. The follow-up appeal related to this lawsuit was likewise rejected by the Court of Appeal on 4 August 2022. In the aftermath, one of the prisoners Abdul Rahim Shapiee was executed on 5 August 2022, the day after the loss of the lawsuit.

Constitutionality challenge
Datchinamurthy, together with Singaporean Jumaat Mohamed Sayed and two Malaysians Saminathan Selvaraju and Lingkesvaran Rajendaren (all three of them also sentenced to death for drug trafficking), filed a joint constitutional challenge against certain provisions of the Misuse of Drugs Act where the two provisions allegedly violate the constitutionally protected presumption of innocence and Articles 9 and 12 of the Constitution, meaning their rights to equal treatment under the law and no deprivation of their lives or personal liberties by non-legal means in their cases. However, the judge found that the two provisions do not  deviate from the prosecution's responsibility to prove its case beyond reasonable doubt, and do not, by any means, violate the Constitution. As such, the appeal of Datchinamurthy and three other prisoners were dismissed by the High Court on 25 November 2022.

See also
 Capital punishment in Singapore
 Pannir Selvam Pranthaman
 Nagaenthran K. Dharmalingam
 Abdul Kahar Othman
 Gobi Avedian

References

Living people
1985 births
Capital punishment in Singapore
Malaysian drug traffickers
Malaysian criminals
Malaysian people of Indian descent
People from Johor Bahru